The Prodigal Son in the Brothel or The Prodigal Son in the Tavern or Rembrandt and Saskia in the parable of the prodigal son is a painting by the Dutch master Rembrandt.  It is now in the Gemäldegalerie Alte Meister of  Dresden, Germany. It is signed "REMBRANDT F.".

It portrays two people who had been identified as Rembrandt himself and his wife Saskia. In the Protestant contemporary world, the theme of the prodigal son was a frequent subject for works of art due to its moral background. Rembrandt himself painted a Return of the Prodigal Son in 1669.

The left side of the canvas was cut, perhaps by the artist himself, to remove secondary characters and focus the observer's attention on the main theme.

Painting materials
The pigment analysis shows Rembrandt's choice of the usual baroque pigments such as red ochre, lead-tin-yellow, madder lake and smalt and also his elaborate multilayer painting technique.

Sources

External links
 The painting in the State Art Gallery in Dresden
 Rembrandt, Self-Portrait with Saskia (The Prodigal Son), ColourLex

Notes and references 

1637 paintings
Paintings by Rembrandt
Collections of the Gemäldegalerie Alte Meister
Rembrandt